The Algeria men's national under-18 basketball team is a national basketball team of Algeria, governed by the Fédération Algérienne de Basket-Ball.
It represents the country in international under-18 (under age 18) basketball competitions.

See also
Algeria men's national basketball team

References

External links
Archived records of Algeria team participations

Basketball in Algeria
Basketball teams in Algeria
Men's national under-18 basketball teams
Basketball